The Paymaster of the Forces was a position in the British government.  The office was established in 1661, one year after the Restoration of the Monarchy to King Charles II, and was responsible for part of the financing of the British Army, in the improved form created by Oliver Cromwell during the Commonwealth. The full title was Paymaster-General of His Majesty's Forces. It was abolished in 1836, near the end of the reign of King William IV, and was replaced by the new post of Paymaster General.

History

The first to hold the office was Sir Stephen Fox (1627–1716), an exceptionally able administrator who had remained a member of the household of King Charles II during his exile in France. Before his time, and before the Civil War, there was no standing army and it had been the custom to appoint treasurers-at-war, ad hoc, for campaigns. Within a generation of the Restoration, the status of the paymastership began to change. In 1692 the then paymaster, Richard Jones, 1st Earl of Ranelagh, was made a member of the Privy Council; and thereafter every paymaster, or when there were two paymasters at least one of them, joined the Privy Council if not already a member. From the accession of Queen Anne the paymaster tended to change with the government. By the 18th century the office had become a political prize and potentially the most lucrative that a parliamentary career could obtain. Appointments to the office were therefore made often not due to merit alone, but also to political affiliation. It was occasionally a cabinet-level post in the 18th and early 19th centuries, and many future prime ministers served as paymaster.

Before the development of the banking system, the duty of the paymaster was to act as the personal sole domestic banker of the army. He received, mainly from the Exchequer, the sums voted by Parliament for military expenditure. Other sums were also received, for example from the sale of old stores. He disbursed these sums, by his own hands or by deputy paymasters, under the authority of sign-manual warrants for ordinary expenses of the army, and under Treasury warrants for extraordinary expenses (expenses unforeseen and unprovided for by Parliament).

During the whole time in which public money was in his hands, from the day of receipt until the receipt of his final discharge (the quietus of the Pipe Office), he assumed unlimited personal liability for the funds, thus his private estate was liable for the money in his hands. Failing the quietus this liability remained without limit of time, passing on his death to his heirs and legal representatives.

Appointments were made by the Crown by letters patent under the Great Seal. The patent salary was £400 from 1661 to 1680 and 20 shillings a day thereafter, except for the years 1702–07 when it was fixed at 10 shillings a day.

The office of Paymaster of the Forces was abolished in 1836 and superseded with the formation of the post of Paymaster General.

List of Paymasters of the Forces

Office merged into that of Paymaster General, 1836.

Paymaster of the Forces Abroad
From 1702 to 1714, during the War of the Spanish Succession, there was a distinct Paymaster of the Forces Abroad, appointed in the same manner as the Paymaster. These were appointed to a special office to oversee the pay of Queen Anne's army in the Low Countries, and are not in the regular succession of Paymasters of the Forces. The salary of the position was 10 shillings a day. Colonel Thomas Moore was paymaster of the land forces in Minorca and in the garrisons of Dunkirk and Gibraltar and is not always counted among the Paymasters of the Forces Abroad.

 Charles Fox (23 December 1702 – 10 May 1705)
 The Hon. James Brydges (10 May 1705 – 4 September 1713)
 Col. Thomas Moore (4 September 1713 – 3 October 1714)

See also
Master-General of the Ordnance
British Army
Paymaster-General

Notes and references
Notes

References